Mikyle Louis (born 19 August 2000) is a Kittitian cricketer. He made his List A debut for the West Indies Under-19s in the 2016–17 Regional Super50 on 31 January 2017.

References

External links
 

2000 births
Living people
Kittitian cricketers
West Indies under-19 cricketers
Place of birth missing (living people)